The Tower is a British police procedural television series based on the first book of Kate London's Metropolitan trilogy book series, Post Mortem. Starring Gemma Whelan as anti-corruption officer Sarah Collins from the fictional DSI department, it is set in 21st-century London and follows the aftermath of the deaths of a veteran Metropolitan Police officer and a young Libyan girl who fell together from the roof of a London tower block. When Constable Lizzie Adama—one of the only witnesses—disappears soon after, Collins' investigation becomes two-pronged: what happened on the roof, and finding Adama.

Although the series is set in southeast London, it was mostly filmed in the northwest of England, particularly Liverpool and Manchester. The Tower was broadcast over three 50-minute episodes in November 2021. Patrick Harbinson acted as both screenwriter and executive producer. The show received generally favourable reviews, with positive comparisons being made by critics to fellow police corruption drama Line of Duty; Whelan's acting was considered a highlight. Criticisms were also made, particularly of the sound engineering, which was accused of muffling the spoken dialogue on occasion.

Kate London
Kate London was born in Staffordshire to a retired RAF officer and a nurse. A graduate of the University of Cambridge, she took up acting and played alongside Hugh Bonneville and Dominic Dromgoole. She travelled to Paris and attended the same clown school as Sacha Baron Cohen would later. She joined the Metropolitan Police Service (MPS) as a uniformed PC in 2006 and left in 2014 as a murder squad detective in a Homicide and Serious Crime Command dealing with major investigations before becoming a full-time author. She also writes regularly for newspapers. When London joined the police, she began to record the events of her working day, particularly the minutiae; she was especially interested in the bigger problems that could stem from tiny errors of judgement. In response to comparisons between The Tower and the murder of Sarah Everard in March 2021, London argued that, in a close-knit institution such as the police, officers often do not speak out or criticize, through fear of becoming known as a troublemaker. London notes that, in the universe of The Tower, this is at the root of the police's problem, and by extension the public's:

Although London lives and writes in Shropshire, her connection with the city of her work remains strong. She has said, "part of me needs the city too: its life, grit, energy and hunger. My novels are set in its streets. I once joked with my publisher that I could write a murder detective's guide to the cafes of London." Critic Joan Smith positively reviewed Post Mortem on its 2015 publication, arguing that London had "vividly recreates the everyday experience of uniformed police, for the most part avoiding the temptation to take sides. The result is a complex novel that offers rare insights into how the police operate." London was nervous of ITV's proposal to televise Post Mortem as she had experienced two previous, unsuccessful attempts at turning her book into script.

Cast
DS Sarah Collins (Gemma Whelan)
DC Steve Bradshaw (Jimmy Akingbola)
Lizzie Adama (Tahirah Sharif)
Inspector Kieran Shaw (Emmett J. Scanlan)
Younes Mehenni (Nabil Elouahabi)
PC Hadley Matthews (Nick Holder)
Farah Mehenni (Lola Elsokari)
Detective Chief Inspector Tim Baillie (Karl Davies)
Rex Parry (Ben Stoddard)
Niamh Cusack (Claire Mills)

Cast background
Gemma Whelan is probably best known as her character Yara Greyjoy in the HBO series Game of Thrones; Collins is her first primetime lead character. Tahirah Sharif was previously seen in The Haunting of Bly Manor and played minor characters in soaps such as Waterloo Road and Casualty. Jimmy Akingbola had roles in Kate & Koji and Holby City, Emmett J. Scanlan and Nick Holder were both in Peaky Blinders, while Nabil Elouhabi has had parts in Deep State, His Dark Materials and Only Fools and Horses. Karl Davies had previously appeared in Happy Valley, Brief Encounters, and Chernobyl, while The Tower was Lola Elsokari's and Ben Stoddard's first television roles.

Characters 

DS Collins—described by The Guardians Hollie Richardson as "a heavy-sighing, perma-frown primetime detective" and an "outlier and an outsider"—is a Detective Sergeant from the Directorate of Special Investigations. The Telegraph suggested that she displayed a "rigid attention to detail at work that masks a sadness in her personal life, which seems to be represented by a signature anorak that is the colour of a dying autumn leaf". Ed Cumming of The Independent, summarises her as "a single, gay, childless cop: it’s made to look like a thankless gig".⁸

PC Lizzie Adama is a newly qualified rookie, having been in the MPS for six months. Constable Matthews, a veteran cop of the old school, aspires to become a police training officer. He is only seen in flashbacks. Kieran Shaw is Adama's and Matthews' immediate superior and has been engaging in an extramarital affair with the former. His relationship with the DSI team becomes increasingly fractious, and Collins suspects him of knowing far more about Adama's disappearance than he is letting on. However, he is protected by his superior, DCI Tim Baillie, until the last series.

Production
The show was commissioned by ITV and produced in three 50-minute episodes by Mammoth Screens—a subsidiary of ITV—and Windhover Films, owned by Harbinson. It was produced and edited by Paul Testar and Gez Morris respectively. Several different scenarists were considered before Patrick Harbinson, who had previously co-produced the Showtime series Homeland, was chosen as both writer and executive producer. It was directed by Jim Loach and developed for television by Sly Fox Productions.

Locations 
The COVID-19 pandemic prevented Harbinson from doing the usual thorough location searches, and he had to rely on images being Dropboxxed to him from around the country. Although set in southeast London, The Tower was predominently filmed in northwest England, with a week spent in London during post-production doing pick-up shots, particularly of the City of London skyline. Northern locations included Liverpool, Manchester, Runcorn, Warrington and Knutsford's Tatton Park. Sharif later recalled the scenes filmed in Liverpool as particularly difficult due to pervasive rain, which made her "emotional, heavy dialogue...challenging". The disused cellars of the Martins Bank Building in Liverpool were used to replicate the police cellblock.

Episodes

Reception

Although the original book was published many years before the murder of Sarah Everard by serving Met officer Wayne Couzens, the show's timing made the comparison obvious to critics. For example, Paul Kendall in The Telegraph placed the show squarely in the context of contemporary police-public relations, particularly in the aftermath of the Couzens case. The Guardian's Lucy Mangan considered the show's release timely, as "trust in officers is at an all-time low". She was generally positive about the first episode, writing that "the plot builds at pace but without inducing vertigo in the viewer" and noting its background of "racial tensions, bigger crimes, personal secrets and political arse-covering". Writing in The Times, Carol Midgley identified an "aura of grim authenticity", which she put down to the original author's police background. Although she noticed a Line of Duty-style "what are all these coppers hiding?" trope, she considered the show to have successfully avoided the tendency to focus on the murder of females.

Midgely criticised the sound engineering, though, complaining that at times it was difficult to hear; "was it just my old ears or were the actors going for a mumbling level worthy of The Wire?" A similar criticism, of muffled—and also hurried—dialogue was made by Digital Spy, who argued that this was a common refrain from viewers on Twitter. Anita Singh of The Telegraph also criticised dialogue which sounded as if some cast members were "mumbling at their shoes". She summed up the series, effectively, as "everyone is lying about what happened and Collins is here to find out why", although she disagreed that the series was derivative of Line of Duty: while the DSI might appear to be another A10, she suggested The Tower had a greater sense of day-to-day realism than similar programmes. Also addressing comparisons with Line of Duty, Ed Cumming suggested that, unlike that show, with The Tower "there isn't much pure evil here, more opportunists and easy-life seekers". He also argued that, thanks to Loach's direction, The Tower was a tighter script—with less "flabbiness"—than many of its genre. However, he was overall critical, arguing that Whelan is the only character to consistently hold the viewers' interest and that, generally, the series could have "aimed a bit higher". The Guardians Barbara Ellen was also less enthusiastic, picking out what she considered an overuse of flashbacks adding unnecessary confusion to an already complex plot, combined with the shoehorning in of too many themes. She was more positive of the dialogue and portrayals, summing up saying "bring back the characters, please, but with a less chaotic story".

Future 
Due to the fact that Post Mortem was the first of three books in a series—the others being Death Message and Gallowstree Lane—speculation mounted that the show would return to depict subsequent events, in which Collins and Adama's careers intersect again. Tahirah Sharif believed that there was plenty of material to allow for the series' expansion, and Emmett Scanlan has pointed out that the later books expand the characters also, particularly Bradshaw's.

Notes

References

External links 
 

2021 British television series debuts
2021 British television series endings
2020s British police procedural television series
2020s British crime drama television series
British detective television series
British thriller television series
English-language television shows
Police corruption in fiction
Television series by ITV Studios
Television series by Mammoth Screen
Television shows filmed in England
Television shows set in London 
Television shows shot in Liverpool